Way Out West is a 1957 album by Sonny Rollins with bassist Ray Brown and drummer Shelly Manne, neither of whom had previously played or recorded with Rollins. The music employs a technique called "strolling", used here by Rollins for the first time, in which he would solo over only bass and drums with no pianist or guitarist playing chords. The recent reissue of the CD has additional takes of three of the songs, including the title track. These additional takes are all about twice as long, containing much longer solos from all three members of the band.

According to the liner notes by producer Lester Koenig, recording began at 3:00 a.m. to fit the musicians' busy schedules, but "[a]t 7 a.m., after four hours of intense concentration, during which they recorded half the album, and should have been exhausted, Sonny said, 'I'm hot now.' Shelly who had been up for 24 hours, said, 'Man, I feel like playing.' And Ray, who was equally tired and had a studio call for the afternoon, just smiled."

The cover photo, taken by celebrated jazz photographer William Claxton, shows Rollins dressed in a Stetson hat, holster and horn in place of a pistol. The photo concept was Rollins' own idea to celebrate his first trip West.

Reception

In his AllMusic review, Scott Yanow wrote: "The timeless Way out West established Sonny Rollins as jazz's top tenor saxophonist (at least until John Coltrane surpassed him the following year). Joined by bassist Ray Brown and drummer Shelly Manne, Rollins is heard at one of his peaks."

Track listing

 "I'm an Old Cowhand (From the Rio Grande)" (Johnny Mercer) – 5:42
 "Solitude" (Duke Ellington) – 7:52
 "Come, Gone" (Sonny Rollins) – 7:53
 "Wagon Wheels" (Peter DeRose) – 10:11
 "There Is No Greater Love" (Isham Jones) – 5:17
 "Way Out West" (Rollins) – 6:30

CD reissue
When the album was reissued on CD in 1988 (and in subsequent years), some alternate takes were included.

 "I'm an Old Cowhand" (Mercer) – 5:40
 "I'm an Old Cowhand" [Alternate Take] – 10:06
 "Solitude" (Ellington) – 7:49
 "Come, Gone" (Rollins) – 7:50
 "Come, Gone" [Alternate Take] – 10:27
 "Wagon Wheels" (DeRose) – 10:09
 "There Is No Greater Love" (Jones) – 5:14
 "Way Out West" (Rollins) – 6:28
 "Way Out West" [Alternate Take] – 6:36

The 20-bit CD issue groups the alternate takes at the end.

Personnel
Sonny Rollins - tenor saxophone
Ray Brown - bass
Shelly Manne - drums

References

1957 albums
Sonny Rollins albums
Contemporary Records albums
Original Jazz Classics albums